Howard Homan Buffett (August 13, 1903 – April 30, 1964) was an American businessman, investor, and politician. He was a four-term Republican United States Representative for the state of Nebraska. He was the father of Warren Buffett, the American billionaire businessman and investor.

Early life
Howard Buffett was born in Omaha, Nebraska to Henrietta Duvall Buffett and Ernest P. Buffett, owners of a grocery business. Ernest P. Buffett's parents were second cousins, both having mainly English descent. The Buffet surname (renamed to Buffett) originates in France with a Huguenot weaver, named John Buffett, who became Buffett's first American Buffett ancestor when he immigrated to New York in the late-1600s. Howard Buffett attended public schools and graduated from the University of Nebraska in Lincoln, Nebraska in 1925. While a student, Buffett was a brother of the Alpha Sigma Phi Fraternity. He married Leila Stahl on December 27, 1925. The Buffetts were active members of Dundee Presbyterian Church. After failing to secure a job in the family grocery business, he started a small stock brokerage firm.

Career
Entering the investment business, Buffett also served on the Omaha board of education from 1939 to 1942. In 1942 he ran for the U.S. House of Representatives in the Nebraska district in which Omaha was located. In that election, Buffett was seen as "a Republican sacrificial lamb in Nebraska's second district when FDR was a popular wartime leader." Nevertheless, he went on to win the Republican nomination in the primary and then the subsequent general election.

He was reelected twice. In 1948 he again was the Republican nominee for another term, but was defeated for reelection; however, he was the Republican nominee for the office again in 1950 and won the office back. In 1952 Buffett decided against seeking another term and returned to his investment business in Omaha, Buffett-Falk & Co., in which he worked until shortly before his death. He also served as the campaign manager for conservative Senator Robert A. Taft in Taft's 1952 presidential campaign.

According to Warren Buffett biographer Roger Lowenstein:

Political philosophy

Howard Buffett is remembered for his highly libertarian Old Right stance, having maintained a friendship with Murray Rothbard for a number of years. He "would invariably draw 'zero' ratings from the Americans for Democratic Action and other leftist groups."

Buffett was a vocal critic of the Truman Doctrine and the Marshall Plan. Of the Truman Doctrine, he said: "Our Christian ideals cannot be exported to other lands by dollars and guns."  Buffett was also "one of the major voices in Congress opposed to the Korean adventure," and "was convinced that the United States was largely responsible for the eruption of conflict in Korea; for the rest of his life he tried unsuccessfully to get the Senate Armed Services Committee to declassify the testimony of CIA head Admiral Roscoe H. Hillenkoetter, which Buffett told [Rothbard] established American responsibility for the Korean outbreak." The CIA failed to predict the Marxist invasion of the Republic of Korea in 1950, just as it had failed to predict the Soviet Atomic Bomb the previous year - 1949, it was these intelligence failures that Rear Admiral Hillenkoetter testified about.

Speaking on the floor of Congress, he opposed military interventionism:

In the summer of 1962, he wrote "an impassioned plea... for the abolition of the draft" in the New Individualist Review. Buffett wrote:

In addition to non-interventionism overseas, Howard Buffett strongly supported the gold standard because he believed it would limit the ability of government to inflate the money supply and spend beyond its means. His son Warren Buffett is not an advocate of the gold standard.

Personal life 
Buffett married Leila Stahl Buffett (March 18, 1904 – August 30, 1996), who was of German and English descent; they had three children:
 Warren Buffett (son): businessman, investor, and philanthropist, Chairman & CEO of Berkshire Hathaway
 Peter Buffett (grandson): musician, composer, and producer
 Howard Graham Buffett (grandson): Corporate board member of Berkshire Hathaway
 Howard Warren Buffett (great-grandson): Public relations professor at Columbia University
Susan Alice Buffett (granddaughter)
 Doris Buffett Bryant (daughter)
 Roberta Buffett Bialek (daughter)

Publications
 Buffett, Howard Homan. Human Freedom Rests on Gold Redeemable Money, Financial Chronicle 5/6/48
 Buffett, Howard Homan. The Evil Men in the Kremlin Must Be Chortling as Militarism Runs Wild in America. Washington, U.S. Government Printing Office, 1952.

References

External links
 "Howard Homan Buffett: Old Rightist Extraordinaire" by Joseph R. Stromberg
 "Howard Buffett: A Man of the Old Right" by Noah M. Clarke
 

|-

1903 births
1964 deaths
20th-century American businesspeople
20th-century American politicians
20th-century Presbyterians
American chief executives of financial services companies
American investors
American libertarians
American people of Scandinavian descent
American Presbyterians
American stockbrokers
Howard Buffett
Businesspeople from Omaha, Nebraska
Christian libertarians
John Birch Society members
Monetary reformers
Non-interventionism
Old Right (United States)
Republican Party members of the United States House of Representatives from Nebraska
School board members in Nebraska
Stock and commodity market managers
University of Nebraska–Lincoln alumni